Raymond Bernard Hamrick [Handsome Ray]  (August 1, 1921 – June 9, 2009) was an infielder in Major League Baseball who played from  through  for the Philadelphia Phillies of the National League. He was born in Nashville, Tennessee.

Fast and steady, Hamrick was one of many ballplayers who interrupted their careers to serve during World War II. Hamrick started his professional baseball career as a shortstop and pitcher in 1939, playing for the Nashville, Charleston and Americus Minor league teams. During his stay at Americus, he made the All-Star team in 1941 and batted over a .300 batting average for most of the year. His most productive season came in 1943, when he hit 145 in 460 at-bats with Nashville for a .310 average.

Hamrick joined the Philadelphia Phillies in 1943. The following season, he began spring training with the team in Wilmington, Delaware, because the war kept the teams out of Florida for camp due to the submarine threat. Hamrick left spring training as Philadelphia's starting shortstop, but he left for the military service after appearing in 74 games. With the end of the war, Hamrick rejoined the team (by then the Phillies) in 1946, but the competition for a roster spot was now overwhelming as Skeeter Newsome became the everyday shortstop.

In a two-season majors career, Hamrick was a .204 hitter (92-for-452) in 118 games, including 34 runs, 32 RBI, 13 doubles, two triples, one home run and one stolen base. He made 74 appearances at shortstop (86) and second base (31), and posted a collective .946 fielding percentage.
 
After that, Hamrick hit .266 (92-for-346) for the Oakland Oaks of the Pacific Coast League in 1946, his last professional baseball season.

Hamrick died in his homeland of Nashville, Tennessee, at the age of 87.

See also
1943 Philadelphia Phillies season
1944 Philadelphia Phillies season

External links

Retrosheet
Baseball in Wartime
Nashville Sounds page
Oakland Oaks page
Sulphur Dell - Obituary

Major League Baseball second basemen
Major League Baseball shortstops
Philadelphia Phillies players
Albuquerque Dukes players
Americus Pioneers players
Beaumont Exporters players
Buffalo Bisons (minor league) players
Charleston Rebels players
Kansas City Blues players
Nashville Vols players
Oakland Oaks (baseball) players
San Francisco Seals (baseball) players
Tri-City Braves players
United States Navy personnel of World War II
Baseball players from Nashville, Tennessee
1921 births
2009 deaths